Mueang Suphan Buri is the capital district (amphoe mueang) of Suphan Buri province, central Thailand.

History

Suphan Buri is an old city. In the era of Ankorian king Jayavarman VII, inscription called Prasat Phra Khan (จารึกปราสาทพระขรรค์) was made and which mentions the name of Suvarnapura. Later Suphan Buri become important city of Ayutthaya kingdom. According to Chinese Annals called "Da Ming Shi Lu" (『大明実録』), Nakharinthathirat (Intharatcha or Nakhon In), before ascending the throne of Ayutthaya, was a ruler of Suphan Buri and tribute to Chinese Emperor as a King of Supan Buri (Su Men Bang Wang or 蘇門邦王). Later in the 16th century, Suphan Buri become battle field of King Naresuan and Burmese crown prince.

This area was the center of Mueang Suphan Buri. When the government created a district, it was called Wihan Daeng. Later the district name was changed to be Tha Phi Liang. In 1939 the district name was changed to Mueang Suphan Buri to correspond with the province name.

Geography
Neighbouring districts are (from the south clockwise): Bang Pla Ma, U Thong, Don Chedi, Si Prachan of Suphan Buri Province; Wiset Chai Chan of Ang Thong province; and Phak Hai of Ayutthaya province.

The main water resource of the district is the Tha Chin river or Suphan river.

Administration

Central administration 
Mueang Suphan Buri is divided into 20 subdistricts (tambons), which are further subdivided into 124 administrative villages (mubans). The provincial administration has its headquarters in Tambon Sanam Chai.

Local administration 
There is one town (thesaban mueang) in the district:
 Suphan Buri consisting of subdistrict Tha Phi Liang and parts of subdistricts Rua Yai and Tha Rahat.

There are seven subdistrict municipalities (thesaban tambons) in the district:
 Ban Pho consisting of subdistrict Ban Pho.
 Huai Wang Thong consisting of parts of subdistrict Pho Phraya.
 Tha Sadet consisting of subdistrict Sa Kaeo.
 Pho Phraya consisting of parts of subdistrict Pho Phraya.
 Suan Taeng consisting of parts of subdistricts Sala Khao, Suan Taeng.
 Tha Rahat consisting of parts of subdistrict Tha Rahat.
 Bang Kung consisting of subdistrict Bang Kung.

There are 14 subdistrict administrative organizations (SAO) in the district:
 Rua Yai consisting of parts of subdistrict Rua Yai.
 Thap Ti Lek consisting of subdistrict Thap Ti Lek.
 Phai Khwang consisting of subdistrict Phai Khwang.
 Khok Kho Thao consisting of subdistrict Khok Kho Thao.
 Don Tan consisting of subdistrict Don Tan.
 Don Masang consisting of subdistrict Don Masang.
 Phihan Daeng consisting of subdistrict Phihan Daeng.
 Don Kamyan consisting of subdistrict Don Kamyan.
 Don Pho Thong consisting of subdistrict Don Pho Thong.
 Taling Chan consisting of subdistrict Taling Chan.
 Sala Khao consisting of parts of subdistrict Sala Khao.
 Suan Taeng consisting of parts of subdistrict Suan Taeng.
 Sanam Chai consisting of subdistrict Sanam Chai.
 Sanam Khli consisting of subdistrict Sanam Khli.

References

Mueang Suphan Buri